Deputy Commissioner (popularly abbreviated as "DC" and DCO) is a chief administrative, land revenue officer/collector and representative of government in district or an administrative sub-unit of a Division in Pakistan He belongs to the commission of Pakistan Administrative Service (PAS) erstwhile DMG/CSP or the Provincial Management Service (PMS)  erstwhile Provincial Civil Service PCS. The PMS officers serve in their respective provinces only whereas PAS officers are posted throughout Pakistan. Deputy commissioners perform their duties under the supervision of a divisional commissioner and commissioners have generally a ceremonial role.

Deputy Commissioner is assisted by Additional Deputy Commissioners(General, Revenue, Finance & Planning) and Assistant Commissioners and District Monitoring Officer, Deputy Director Development and General Assistant Revenue.

Divisional Commissioner is assisted by Additional Commissioners (Revenue, Consolidation, Coordination) and Assistant Commissioners (General, Revenue) and Director Development.

In absence/transfer of Commissioner, Deputy Commissioner of division headquarter holds the acting charge, normally.

List of Serving Deputy Commissioners 
As of sept 2022, following are the names of serving DCs in Pakistan:

Islamabad Capital Territory (ICT), Federal Capital

Punjab Province

List of Serving Commissioners

Islamabad, ICT, Federal Capital

Punjab Province

Sindh Province

History

Post devolution Local Government Reforms (2001 to 2008) 
During the Presidency of Pervaz Musharraf, the office of deputy commissioner was replaced with District Coordination Officer i.e. DCO except in Islamabad. Also, the office of Divisional Commissioner was abolished. After his presidency, provincial governments of Pakistan again established this office through constitutional amendments.

However the office of Deputy Commissioner is deprived of its previous powers of as a District Magistrate. Subsequently, Additional Deputy Commissioners and Assistant Commissioners does not execute the role of Additional District Magistrate and Sub Divisional Magistrate, respectively. Magisterial powers are now executed by judicial officers and judges.

Post Independence of Pakistan 

The district continued to be the unit of administration after Indian Partition and independence of Pakistan in 1947. Initially, the role of the district collector remained largely unchanged, except for the separation of most judicial powers to judicial officers of the district.

Pre Independence 
District administration in Pakistan is a legacy of the British Raj. District collectors were members of the British Indian Civil Service and were charged with supervising general administration in the district.

Warren Hastings introduced the office of the district collector in 1772. Sir George Campbell, lieutenant-governor of Bengal from 1871 to 1874, intended "to render the heads of districts no longer the drudges of many departments and masters of none, but in fact the general controlling authority over all departments in each district."

The office of a collector/DC during the British rule in Indian subcontinent held multiple responsibilitiesas collector, he was the head of the revenue organization, charged with registration, alteration, and partition of holdings; the settlement of disputes; the management of indebted estates; loans to agriculturists, and famine relief. As district magistrate, he exercised general supervision over the inferior courts and in particular, directed the police work. The office was meant to achieve the "peculiar purpose" of collecting revenue and of keeping the peace. The superintendent of police (SP), inspector general of jails, the surgeon general, the divisional forest officer (DFO) and the chief engineer (CE) had to inform the collector of every activity in their departments.

Until the later part of the nineteenth century, no native was eligible to become a district collector. But with the introduction of open competitive examinations for the British Indian Civil Service, the office was opened to natives. Anandaram Baruah, an eminent scholar of Sanskrit and the sixth Indian and the first Assamese ICS officer, became the third Indian to be appointed a district magistrate, the first two being Romesh Chandra Dutt and Sripad Babaji Thakur respectively.

Responsibilities
The responsibilities of deputy commissioner vary from province to province. In Pakistan, these responsibilities changed with the passage of time. However, now the local government law of all provisional governments is similar to a large extent to the law of Punjab Province. Below some of the duties of a deputy commissioner are given:
 To supervise and monitor the discharge of duties by the Assistant Commissioners in the district.
 Coordination of work of all the sister offices and public facilities in the district.
 Efficient use of public resources for the integrated development and effective service delivery.
 To supervise and coordinate the implementation of the government policies, instructions and guidelines of the Government.
 To support and facilitate the offices and public facilities in the district.
 The Deputy Commissioner on his/her own, or on the request of the head of a local government or head of the District Police, may convene a meeting for purposes of maintaining public order and public safety and safeguarding public or private properties in the District; and, the decisions taken in the meeting shall be executed by all concerned accordingly.
 Deputy Commissioner is able to hold court sessions in criminal cases as justice of the peace. Moreover, the performance of the Assistant Commissioner (AC) within the district is also monitored by him/her.

See also 
 Chief secretary
 District Coordination Officer
 Punjab public service commission
 Pakistan Administrative Service

References

Pakistani civil servants